Andreas Undall (1669-1728) was a Norwegian government official. He served as the County Governor of Lister og Mandal county from 1699 to 1711 and then he was the Diocesan Governor of Bergenhus stiftamt from 1711 until his death in 1728.

References

1669 births
1728 deaths
County governors of Norway